Brinkburn is a civil parish in Northumberland, England. It is divided by the River Coquet. The parish includes the hamlet of Pauperhaugh.

History 
The name "Brinkburn" means 'Brynca's stream'.

Governance 
The civil parish was formed on 1 April 1955 from the parishes of Brinkburn High Ward, Brinkburn Low Ward and Raw.

See also  
Brinkburn Priory
Brinkburn Mill
Brinkburn railway station

References

External links

 Brinkburn at Keys to the Past from durham.gov.uk
GENUKI (Accessed: 15 November 2008)

Villages in Northumberland
Civil parishes in Northumberland